Tamas Dobozy is a Canadian writer and professor at Wilfrid Laurier University.

Early life
Dobozy was born in the city of Nanaimo, British Columbia, Canada. Between the ages of 3 and 18 he lived in Powell River, British Columbia, and subsequently in Victoria, Montreal, Budapest, Vancouver, Toronto, and St. John's. He received his BA/BFA in English/Creative Writing from The University of Victoria, his MA in English from Concordia University, and his Ph.D. in English from the University of British Columbia.

Career
Dobozy taught at Memorial University and currently teaches in the Department of English and Film Studies at Wilfrid Laurier University in Ontario.

Awards and honors
1995 sub-Terrain Short Fiction Contest Winner for "Like A Salmon Getting Me Down"
2003 Danuta Gleed Award shortlist for When X Equals Marylou
2011 O Henry Award for "The Restoration of the Villa Where Tíbor Kálmán Once Lived"
2012 Camera Obscura Editors' Award for Outstanding Fiction for "The Selected Mugshots of Famous Hungarian Assassins"
2012 Rogers Writers' Trust Fiction Prize winner for Siege 13
2012 Governor General's Awards shortlist for Siege 13
2013 Frank O'Connor International Short Story Award shortlist for Siege 13
2014 National Magazine Awards, Gold Medal for Fiction for "Krasnagorsk-2" published in The New Quarterly

Bibliography
 When X Equals Marylou (Arsenal Pulp, 2002)
 Last Notes and Other Stories (HarperCollins Canada/Arcade, 2005)
 Siege 13: Stories (Thomas Allen/Milkweed, 2012)
 5 Mishaps (School Gallery, 2021)
 Ghost Geographies: Fictions (New Star Books, 2021)

References

Canadian male short story writers
Writers from British Columbia
People from Nanaimo
Living people
21st-century Canadian short story writers
21st-century Canadian male writers
Year of birth missing (living people)